Christopher  Willard (born 15 September 1960) is an American-born novelist, critic, short story writer and visual artist.

Life
Born in Bangor, Maine, Willard was raised in Vermont. He attended the Portland School of Art, renamed the Maine College of Art, and completed his education at Hunter College.
He currently lives in Calgary, Alberta and teaches at Alberta College of Art and Design.

Work
Willard's art is  associated with neo-op art and neo-conceptualism.  Willard is also known as a writer, expert in color theory, and critic.  His art is held in collections.  He is currently an associate professor in the department of painting at Alberta University of the Arts.

Fiction Writing
 Garbage Head. Willard, Christopher. Garbage Head. Véhicule Press/Esplanade Books, 2005.
 Sundre. Willard, Christopher. Sundre. Véhicule Press/Esplanade Books, 2009.

Non-Fiction Writing
 Watercolor Mixing: The 12-Hue Method. Willard, Christopher. Watercolor Mixing: The 12-Hue Method. Rockport Press, 2000.
Poetry Writing
 Ship of Theseus. Willard, Christopher. Ship of Theseus. Crisis Chronicles Press, 2016.

Awards
Garbage Head
Shortlisted for the Canadian Library Association Young Adult Canadian Book Award, 2006
Shortlisted for the Expozine Award, 2006
Selected for Take a Joy Read Canada, 2006
Longlisted for the ReLit Award, 2006
Longlisted for the Stephen Leacock Memorial Medal for Humour, 2006

References
 
 http://www.vehiculepress.com/titles/393.html

External links
 Véhicule Press, Sundre
 Meghan Fish Contemporary
 Shotgun Review
 Alberta Biennial, Art Gallery of Alberta
 Faculty Focus, Reconsidering Grading Students on Class Participation, February 22, 2010.
 Crisis Chronicles Press, Ship of Theseus

1960 births
Living people
Artists from Bangor, Maine
Artists from Calgary
Canadian male novelists
Canadian male short story writers
Canadian male painters
Hunter College alumni
Maine College of Art alumni
Writers from Bangor, Maine
Writers from Calgary
20th-century Canadian painters
21st-century Canadian male writers
21st-century Canadian short story writers
21st-century Canadian painters
20th-century Canadian male artists
21st-century Canadian male artists